The Mayo Minor Football Championship is an annual Gaelic football competition for clubs affiliated with Mayo GAA. It is restricted to players under the age of 18.  It consists of 4 regional competitions based on geographical area followed by county semi finals and final. The current champions are Castlebar Mitchels.

Roll of honour

References

Mayo GAA club championships